Athletics has been contested at every Summer Olympics since the birth of the modern Olympic movement at the 1896 Summer Olympics. The athletics program traces its earliest roots to  events used in the ancient Greek Olympics. The modern program includes track and field events, road running events, and race walking events. Cross country running was also on the program in earlier editions but it was dropped after the 1924 Summer Olympics.

Summary

Events 
The events contested have varied widely. From 1900 to 1920, tug of war was considered to be part of the Olympic athletics programme, although the sports of tug of war and athletics are now considered distinct.

Men's events 
No new events have been added to the men's athletics programme since the 1952 addition of the short racewalk.  The roster of events has not changed since then, with the exception of the omission of the long racewalk in 1976 (the IAAF held a 50 km walk World Championships that year instead and as a result the event was restored in 1980). The long racewalk is the only event currently held for men but not included on the women's programme, with the exception of women taking part in the heptathlon rather than the decathlon and the 100 metres hurdles rather than the 110 metres hurdles. The last women's event added to the roster was the 3000 metres steeplechase in 2008.

A total of 52 different events have been held in the men's competition. The current list comprises 23 events.  Many of the discontinued events were similar to modern ones but at different lengths, especially in the steeplechasing, hurdling, and racewalking disciplines.  Team racing events have been eliminated after appearing in six early editions of the Games.  The athletic triathlon (an unusual event, held only once and featuring gymnasts competing in the long jump, shot put, and 100 metre dash) and pentathlon multi-discipline events were phased out in favor of the decathlon, and the medley relay replaced with even-leg relays.  Standing jump competitions are no longer held, nor are the various modified throwing events which were experimented with in 1908 and 1912. Cross country running was on the program from 1912 to 1924 and is the most prominent form of athletics not to feature at the Olympics.

Women's events 
Women's competition in athletics began at the 1928 Summer Olympics

Mixed event 
The mixed event, a 4 x 400 meters relay, first made an appearance at the 2020 Summer Olympics. The event includes teams of four athletes, two men and two women who are allowed to run in any order decided by the team.

Nations 
Nearly every nation that has competed at the Olympics has entered the athletics competition, except Bhutan. The number in each box represents the number of athletes the nation sent.

Medal table 
Updated after the 2020 Summer Olympics, considering stripped medals as of March 23, 2022

Sources:

See also 

Athletics at the Summer Paralympics
Athletics at the Youth Olympic Games

References

External links 

 Olympic sports
 Results from 1896 to 2016
 Sports in Olympics | List of Bizarre Sports in Olympics

 
Olympic Games
Sports at the Summer Olympics